Big Muddy is an unincorporated community located in Converse County, Wyoming, United States.

Big Muddy was named after a nearby creek.

Notable person
 Bryant B. Brooks (1861-1944) - cowboy, trapper, owner of the V Bar V Ranch, politician, author; served as Governor of Wyoming from 1905 to 1911, Wyoming Cowboy Hall of Fame 2018

References

Unincorporated communities in Converse County, Wyoming
Unincorporated communities in Wyoming
Coal towns in Wyoming